K09YL-D was a low-powered television station owned and operated by International Communications Network Inc. It broadcasts on channel 9 and licensed to San Diego, California. It was the digital test broadcast of K61GH (now KSDY-LD) and was broadcast from its offices at 4645 Ruffner Road suite C. The station would cease operations in mid-2011, after K61GH was converted to digital on channel 50, as K50LL-D; around this point, the station's owners turned in K09YL-D's license to the FCC for cancellation.

Subchannels
The station's digital signal was multiplexed:

External links 
Query the FCC's TV station database for DK09YL
 Rabbit Ears

Defunct television stations in the United States
Television channels and stations established in 1998
Television channels and stations disestablished in 2011
09YL-D
2011 disestablishments in California
1998 establishments in California
09YL-D